Hannah Montana Hits Remixed is the second remix album by American pop recording artist Miley Cyrus, in the role of the character Hannah Montana. It was the fifth Hannah Montana album released on August 19, 2008, exclusively at American Walmart stores. The album features singles from both of the previous television soundtracks, Hannah Montana and Hannah Montana 2. Several writers and producers worked on the songs, mainly Matthew Gerrard and Robbie Nevil. The album peaked at number one hundred-three in Billboard 200 and at four in Top Kid Audio. All songs were remixed by music producers Marco Marinangeli and Simone Sello.

Background
The album features singles that were released on both of the previous television soundtracks, Hannah Montana and Hannah Montana 2. Most of Hits Remixed, who have formerly collaborated for other Disney acts like High School Musical. The American Idol judge, Kara DioGuardi co-wrote and co-produced "We Got the Party" along with Greg Wells, Brian Green, Matthew Wilder and more. Other personnel include: Jamie Houston, Aris Archontis, Jeannie Lurie, Chen Neeman, Jay Landers and Holly Mathis.

Hannah Montana: Hits Remixed was sold exclusively on August 19, 2008, through the American retail company Walmart in the United States. That later changed as the album was released internationally, more than a year later.

Chart performance
For the week ending September 6, 2008, Hannah Montana: Hits Remixed debuted and peaked at number one hundred-three in the United States, under the chart, Billboard 200. In its second week, the remix album completely fell from the chart. However, it also charted on Kid Albums, then Top Kid Audio, debuting in the top ten. For the week ending September 13, Hannah Montana: Hits Remixed reached number four on the chart. The album spent a total of seven weeks on the chart.

Track listing
All tracks are produced by their original producers from both the Hannah Montana and Hannah Montana 2 soundtracks. All tracks remixed by Marco Marinangeli and Simone Sello.

Charts

Release history

References

External links
The official website of Hannah Montana

Hannah Montana albums
2008 remix albums
Walt Disney Records remix albums
Walt Disney Records EPs
Remix albums by American artists
Pop rock remix albums
Teen pop remix albums
Remix EPs